Patrick Michael Baldwin (born 12 November 1982) is an English semi-professional footballer who last played as a defender for Beer Albion FC.

Baldwin began his career at Chelsea, but after failing to break into the first team moved to Colchester United, where between 2002 and 2012, he made over 200 league appearances. He has played for Southend United in two spells and on-loan for Bristol Rovers.

Personal life 

Just weeks after signing for Colchester in September 2002, Baldwin was bizarrely involved in two road accidents in the same day while on his way to training from his home in Southend-on-Sea. The first incident was a bump from behind and the second a collision with a mini-bus after skidding across a roundabout. He escaped from both incidents unhurt.

He studied at Staffordshire University for a degree in sports, graduating in 2015.

Playing career

Colchester United
Baldwin signed for Colchester United from Chelsea on 12 August 2002. Baldwin, born in City of London, failed to make an appearance for the Chelsea first-team, and was released by the club at the end of the 2001–02 season. He had spent ten years as a trainee for the London club, working under Steve Clarke and training alongside the likes of John Terry, Frank Lampard and Eiður Guðjohnsen, with Carlton Cole and Robert Huth in the same youth team as Baldwin.

Baldwin was loaned out to St Albans City in the Isthmian League in 2003, where he made three appearances for the club. After spending two seasons on the fringes of the first-team, he became a regular starter for the U's in the 2004–05 season, being rewarded a new two-year contract in March 2005 and leading him to be named as Colchester United 'Player of the Year' for 2005.

In 2006, an FA Cup run led to Colchester being paired against Baldwin's former club Chelsea, allowing him to play against the club he joined as a ten-year-old. Colchester would lose the game 3–1 after taking the lead. The same season, Baldwin aided the U's to second position in League One and promotion to the second tier for the first time in the club's history during the 2005–06 season.

On 25 November 2006, Baldwin scored his first and only league goal for Colchester in a 3–0 victory in the Essex derby over rivals Southend United.

Baldwin agreed to another two-year contract extension in February 2007 on the back of Colchester's success in their debut season in the Championship, with Baldwin a regular starter. He was sent-off in a 2–1 home league defeat to Crystal Palace on 24 November 2007, his first red card for the club.

In January 2008, Baldwin suffered shoulder and knee injuries that would keep him out for nine months, unable to help Colchester's relegation from the second to the third tier of English football. He played his first game with the reserve team during his comeback at the new Colchester Community Stadium on 9 September 2008.

In January 2009, Baldwin was involved in the U's first away clean-sheet since August 2007 in a 0–0 draw with Bristol Rovers, a span of 17 months, having played in both fixtures, the other being a 3–0 away win at Preston North End. His performances and consistency garnered praise from manager Paul Lambert following a run of good results and clean-sheets. In the summer of 2009, Baldwin signed a new three-year contract extension.

Bristol Rovers loan
Following an injury lay-off and falling out of favour under new Colchester manager Aidy Boothroyd, Baldwin was signed by Bristol Rovers on loan in November 2009. He made six appearances on loan with Bristol Rovers but his future at Colchester was in doubt, with manager Boothroyd telling Baldwin that he was fifth in line to Magnus Okuonghae, Paul Reid, Danny Batth and Matt Heath in central defence. He was set to sign for Bristol permanently following his loan spell in early January 2010, however with a transfer fee agreed between the two clubs, Baldwin decided to stay and fight for a place with Colchester.

Southend United loan
On 29 January 2010, both Baldwin and teammate Scott Vernon signed on-loan for rivals Southend United until the end of the season, but neither were able to play in the Essex derby on 8 February. He started against Swindon Town the following day and scored an 89th-minute equaliser to bring the score to 2–2. He made 18 appearances on loan for the Shrimpers.

Return to Colchester
With Baldwin out of favour under Aidy Boothroyd, his exit in the summer of 2010 to Coventry City and promotion of John Ward from assistant allowed Baldwin an entrance back into the first-team, having played just eight times during the 2009–10 season, benefiting from an injury to Paul Reid. However, he then suffered an ankle injury, keeping him out of action from September to October 2010.

In a 2–0 away defeat to Brighton on 25 January 2011, Baldwin received the second red card of his Colchester career for a second bookable offence late in the game.

Baldwin made his first start of the 2011–12 season in a Football League Trophy match against Barnet on 30 August 2011, a game which Colchester lost 3–1 with Baldwin scoring the U's consolation goal. This was to be his second and final goal for the club.

Southend United
On 30 January 2012, Baldwin signed permanently for Essex rivals Southend United on a free transfer, following his loan spell with the club in the 2009–10 season. Baldwin made just two appearances for Southend before being shipped out on loan to Exeter City in March 2012 until the end of the season, making nine appearances.

Exeter City
Baldwin signed permanently for Exeter City on 2 July 2012 following the expiration of his short-term Southend contract. He scored his first goal for the club on 8 December 2012, the opening goal in a 3–2 victory over Rochdale at Spotland.

Career statistics

Honours

Club 
 Colchester United
 League One Runners-up: 2005–06

Individual 
 Colchester United Player of the Year: 2004-05

References

External links
Pat Baldwin player profile at Exeter City

1982 births
Living people
People from the City of London
Footballers from Greater London
English footballers
Association football defenders
Chelsea F.C. players
Colchester United F.C. players
St Albans City F.C. players
Bristol Rovers F.C. players
Southend United F.C. players
Exeter City F.C. players
English Football League players
Alumni of Staffordshire University
Weymouth F.C. players